The Northern Army Group (NORTHAG) was a NATO military formation comprising five Army Corps from five NATO member nations. During the Cold War NORTHAG was NATO's forward defence in the Northern half of the Federal Republic of Germany (FRG). The Southern half of the Federal Republic of Germany was to be defended by the four Army Corps of NATO's Central Army Group (CENTAG). During wartime NORTHAG would command four frontline corps (I Dutch, I German, I British, I Belgian) and one reserve corps (III US). Air support was provided by Second Allied Tactical Air Force.

In 1966, France had withdrawn from the NATO Military Command Structure, but still wished to take part in the defence of Western Europe. A series of secret agreements made between NATO'ss Supreme Allied Commander Europe  and the French Chief of the Defence Staff detailed how French forces would reintegrate into the NATO Command Structure in case of war. The first and most important was the Lemnitzer-Ailleret Agreements, made between General Lyman Lemnitzer and French CDS General Charles Ailleret in August 1966. There were two additional French formations, the III Corps, and Rapid Action Force (FAR) associated with the Army Group. From 1983 to 1984, Isby and Kamps write that planning was underway to possibly use III Corps and FAR formations in NORTHAG "although they would, like all French forces, remain under national operational command."

Army Group Headquarters 
What can be gathered publicly about the wartime structure of NORTHAG in the autumn of 1989 at the end of the Cold War follows below. It is not drawn from one single source, and may be inconsistent and/or incomplete.
 Headquarters Northern Army Group, JHQ Rheindahlen, Federal Republic of Germanynote 1
 12 Flight AAC, RAF Wildenrath, (4x Aérospatiale Gazelle AH.1)
 German Signal Battalion 840
 Dutch Signal Company
 13th Belgian Signal Company
 NORTHAG Signal Company (Air Support), which consisted of soldiers from all four nations.

Northern Territorial Command
The German Northern Territorial Command (Territorialkommando Nord), headquartered in Mönchengladbach, was a corps-sized command responsible for NORTHAG's Rear Combat Zone, which extended from the Belgian and Dutch border to approximately the middle of Northern West Germany. The Command's tasks were to ensure an uninterrupted flow of war materiel to allied forces fighting in the Combat Zone and to provide hospital care for wounded troops.

British rear and communications zones 
During the transition to war, the support units of the British Army of the Rhine would have formed the British Rear Combat Zone headquartered in Düsseldorf, which would have supplied the fighting forces and guarded the lines of communication within West Germany. Further West in Belgium was the British Communications Zone, which was headquartered in Emblem, outside Antwerp and tasked with receiving reinforcements and supplies from Great Britain and to co-ordinate their onward movement to 1 (BR) Corps.

The following infantry battalions, based in the United Kingdom, were tasked with Rear Area Security in BAOR's Communications Zone and Rear Combat Zone:
 2nd Btn, Royal Green Jackets, Dover, (43x Saxon APC, 8x FV721 Fox, 8x 81mm Mortars)
 1st Btn, 52nd Lowland Volunteers (V), Glasgow
 2nd Btn, 51st Highland Volunteers (V), Elgin
 3rd (Volunteer) Btn, Royal Regiment of Wales (V), Cardiff
 4th (Volunteer) Btn, Queen's Lancashire Regiment (V), Preston
 4th (Volunteer) Btn, Royal Irish Rangers (V), Portadown
 5th (Volunteer) Btn, Royal Irish Rangers (V), Armagh
 5th/8th (Volunteer) Btn, King's Regiment (V), Warrington

Commander Engineers BAOR 
 Commander Engineers BAOR, JHQ Rheindahlen
 30th Engineer Brigade (V), Stafford, UK - the brigade would join BAOR within 72 hours of mobilization.
 Royal Monmouthshire Royal Engineers (Militia), Monmouth
 75th Engineer Regiment, Royal Engineers (V), Manchester
 111th Engineer Regiment, Royal Engineers (V), Camberley
 125th (Staffordshire) Field Support Squadron, Royal Engineers, Stoke-on-Trent
 143rd Plant Squadron, Royal Engineers, Walsall
 30th Engineer Brigade Workshop, Royal Electrical and Mechanical Engineers (V), Stafford
 40th Army Engineer Support Group, Royal Engineers, Willich
 38th Engineer Regiment, Royal Engineers, Ripon, UK, supports the RAF Harrier Force
 39th Engineer Regiment (Airfield Damage Repair), Royal Engineers, Waterbeach, UK
 101st (London) Engineer Regiment (Explosive Ordnance Disposal), Royal Engineers (V), London, UK
 10th Field Squadron (Airfields), 38th Engineer Regiment, Royal Engineers, Gütersloh, (Forward deployed, 24x FV432 APC, 12x FV103 Spartan, 9x engineer vehicles)
 14th Independent Topographic Squadron, Royal Engineers, Ratingen
 52nd Field Squadron (Construction), 22nd Engineer Regiment, Royal Engineers, RAF Bruggen, (Forward deployed)
 135th Independent Topographic Squadron, Royal Engineers (V), London, UK
 501st Specialist Team (Bulk Petrol), Royal Engineers (V), Camberley, UK
 503rd Specialist Team (Bulk Petrol), Royal Engineers (V), Camberley, UK, tasked with repairing damage to the Central European Pipeline System
 516th Specialist Team (Bulk Petrol), Royal Engineers, RAF Gütersloh
 520th Specialist Team (Well Drilling), Royal Engineers (V), Camberley, UK
 521st Specialist Team (Well Drilling), Royal Engineers, Camberley, UK

Commander Postal & Courier Service BAOR 
 Commander Postal & Courier Service BAOR, Royal Engineers, Düsseldorf
 3rd Postal & Courier Regiment, Royal Engineers, Düsseldorf
 4th (NATO) Postal & Courier Regiment, Royal Engineers, Brunssum, Netherlands

Commander Communications BAOR 
 Commander Communications BAOR, JHQ Rheindahlen
 4th Signal Group, JHQ Rheindahlen
 13th Signal Regiment, Royal Signals, Birgelen, BAOR's Signals Intelligence unit, one squadron at RAF Gatow in West Berlin
 16th Signal Regiment, Royal Signals, Krefeld
 21st Signal Regiment (Air Support), Royal Signals, RAF Wildenrath, supports Royal Air Force Germany/2 ATAF
 56th Signal Squadron, Royal Signals (V), Sandgate, UK
 608th Signal Troop (Cipher Equipment), Royal Signals, Viersen
 NORTHAG Signal Support Group, JHQ Rheindahlen
 28th Signal Regiment (NORTHAG), Royal Signals, Sankt Tönis
 227th Signal Squadron (AFCENT), Royal Signals, Maastricht, Belgium
 228th Signal Squadron (SHAPE), Royal Signals, Mons, Belgium
 641st Signal Troop 2 ATAF, Royal Signals, JHQ Rheindahlen
 11th Signal Brigade (V), Stafford, UK - the brigade was planned to join BAOR within 72 hours of mobilization.
 31st (Greater London) Signal Regiment, Royal Signals (V), London
 33rd (Lancashire & Cheshire) Signal Regiment, Royal Signals (V), Huyton
 35th (South Midlands) Signal Regiment, Royal Signals (V), Sutton Coldfield
 12th Signal Brigade (V), Chelsea, UK - the brigade would join BAOR within 72 hours of mobilization.
 34th (Northern) Signal Regiment, Royal Signals (V), Middlesbrough
 36th (Eastern) Signal Regiment, Royal Signals (V), Wanstead
 40th (Ulster) Signal Regiment, Royal Signals (V), Belfast
 81st Signal Squadron, Royal Signals (V), Catterick

Commander Transport & Movements BAOR 
 Commander Transport & Movements BAOR
 HQ 2nd Transport Group, Royal Corps of Transport, Düsseldorf
 156th (Merseyside & Greater Manchester) Transport Regiment, Royal Corps of Transport (V), Birkenhead, UK
 160th Transport Regiment, Royal Corps of Transport (V), Grantham, UK
 161st Ambulance Regiment, Royal Corps of Transport (V), Grantham, UK
 163rd Transport and Movement Regiment, Royal Corps of Transport (V), Grantham, UK
 79th Railway Squadron, Royal Corps of Transport, Mönchengladbach, (17x Locomotives, 265x Rolling Stock)
 275th Railway Squadron, Royal Corps of Transport (V), Grantham, UK
 71st Movement Control Squadron, Royal Corps of Transport, Mönchengladbach
 Joint Helicopter Support Unit (Germany), Gütersloh, joint RAF/Army unit supporting No. 18 Squadron RAF's Boeing CH-47 Chinook transport helicopters
 414th Tank Transporter Unit, Royal Corps of Transport, Bulford, UK
 HQ Communications Zone, Royal Corps of Transport , Antwerp, Belgium
 602nd Transport Unit, Royal Corps of Transport, Antwerp, Belgium
 68th Transport Squadron, Royal Corps of Transport, JHQ Rheindahlen
 221st Transport Squadron, Royal Corps of Transport (V), Glasgow, UK

Commander Medical BAOR 
 Commander Medical BAOR, Düsseldorf
 Commander Medical Rear Communication Zone, Düsseldorf
 30th General Hospital, Royal Army Medical Corps, Woolwich, UK
 31st General Hospital, Royal Army Medical Corps, Iserlohn
 201st (Northern) General Hospital, Royal Army Medical Corps (V), Newton Aycliffe, UK
 205th (Scottish) General Hospital, Royal Army Medical Corps (V), Inverness, UK
 207th (Manchester) General Hospital, Royal Army Medical Corps (V), Blackburn, UK
 208th (Merseyside) General Hospital, Royal Army Medical Corps (V), Ellesmere Port, UK
 224th Field Ambulance, Royal Army Medical Corps (V), Stoke-on-Trent, UK
 225th (Highland) Field Ambulance, Royal Army Medical Corps (V), Forfar, UK
 252nd (Highland) Field Ambulance, Royal Army Medical Corps (V), Aberdeen, UK
 253rd (Northern Ireland) Field Ambulance, Royal Army Medical Corps (V), Belfast, UK
 304th General Hospital, Royal Army Medical Corps (V), UK
 82nd Field Medical Equipment Depot, Royal Army Medical Corps, Düsseldorf
 382nd Field Medical Company, Royal Army Medical Corps
 Commander Medical Communication Zone, Antwerp, Belgium
 34th Evacuation Hospital, Royal Army Medical Corps, Catterick, UK
 308th Evacuation Hospital, Royal Army Medical Corps (V), Aldershot, UK
 307th Field Ambulance, Royal Army Medical Corps (V), Aldershot, UK
 381st Field Medical Equipment Depot, Royal Army Medical Corps (V), Aldershot, UK

Commander Supply BAOR 
 Commander Supply BAOR, Düsseldorf
 15th Ordnance Group, Royal Army Ordnance Corps, Dülmen
 Forward Stores Depot, Royal Army Ordnance Corps, Dülmen
 Forward Vehicle Depot, Royal Army Ordnance Corps, Recklinghausen
 4th Petrol Depot, Royal Army Ordnance Corps, Warendorf
 154th Forward Ammo Depot, Royal Army Ordnance Corps, Wulfen
 3rd Base Ammo Depot, Royal Army Ordnance Corps, 
 72nd Ordnance Company (Ammo), Royal Army Ordnance Corps (V), Telford, UK
 73rd Ordnance Company (Petrol), Royal Army Ordnance Corps (V), Romford, UK
 74th Ordnance Company (Petrol), Royal Army Ordnance Corps (V), Camberley, UK
 221st (BAOR) EOD Company, Royal Army Ordnance Corps, Herford
 Communications Zone Ordnance Depot, Antwerp, Belgium

Commander Maintenance BAOR 
 Commander Maintenance BAOR, Mönchengladbach
 Rear Combat Zone:
 23rd Base Workshop, Royal Electrical and Mechanical Engineers, Wetter
 37th (Rhine) Workshop, Royal Electrical and Mechanical Engineers, Mönchengladbach
 62nd Rear Combat Zone Workshop, Royal Electrical and Mechanical Engineers, Mönchengladbach
 64th Rear Combat Zone Workshop, Royal Electrical and Mechanical Engineers, Willich
 207th Support Workshop, Royal Electrical and Mechanical Engineers (V), Bordon, UK
 209th Support Workshop, Royal Electrical and Mechanical Engineers (V), Bordon, UK
 211th Rear Combat Zone Workshop, Royal Electrical and Mechanical Engineers (V), Bordon, UK
 118th Recovery Company, Royal Electrical and Mechanical Engineers (V), Northampton, UK
 Communications Zone:
 60th Communications Zone Workshop, Royal Electrical and Mechanical Engineers, Antwerp, Belgium
 201st Support Workshop, Royal Electrical and Mechanical Engineers (V), Bordon, UK
 218th Port Workshop, Royal Electrical and Mechanical Engineers (V), Bordon, UK
 219th Port Workshop, Royal Electrical and Mechanical Engineers (V), Bordon, UK
 215th Recovery Company, Royal Electrical and Mechanical Engineers (V), Bordon, UK
 Theatre Units in 1 (BR) Corps Area:
 57th Station Workshop, Royal Electrical and Mechanical Engineers, Paderborn
 58th Station Workshop, Royal Electrical and Mechanical Engineers, Minden
 61st Station Workshop, Royal Electrical and Mechanical Engineers, Dortmund
 63rd Station Workshop, Royal Electrical and Mechanical Engineers, Hannover
 280th NATO HQ Workshop, Royal Electrical and Mechanical Engineers (V), Bordon, UK, supports SHAPE
 281st NATO HQ Workshop, Royal Electrical and Mechanical Engineers (V), Bordon, UK, supports AFCENT
 282nd NATO HQ Workshop, Royal Electrical and Mechanical Engineers (V), Bordon, UK, Supports NORTHAG

Provost Marshal BAOR 
 Provost Marshal BAOR, JHQ Rheindahlen
 Special Investigations Branch (Germany), JHQ Rheindahlen
 101st Provost Company, Royal Military Police, Düsseldorf
 102nd Provost Company, Royal Military Police, JHQ Rheindahlen
 175th Provost Company, Royal Military Police, Lisburn, UK
 176th Provost Company, Royal Military Police, Derry, UK
 243rd Provost Company, Royal Military Police (V), Edinburgh, UK
 252nd Provost Company, Royal Military Police (V), Stockton-on-Tees, UK
 253rd Provost Company, Royal Military Police (V), London, UK
 254th Provost Company, Royal Military Police (V), Belfast, UK

HQ Intelligence & Security Group (Germany) 
 HQ Intelligence & Security Group (Germany), JHQ Rheindahlen
 2nd Intelligence Company, Intelligence Corps, JHQ Rheindahlen
 4th Security Company, Intelligence Corps, Düsseldorf
 5th Security Company, Intelligence Corps, Hannover
 6th Intelligence Company (Photo Intell), Intelligence Corps, JHQ Rheindahlen
 7th Intelligence Company, Intelligence Corps, Bielefeld
 20th Security Company, Intelligence Corps (V), London, UK
 21st Intelligence Company (Imagery Analysis), Intelligence Corps (V), London, UK
 22nd Intelligence Company, Intelligence Corps (V), London, UK
 23rd Security Company, Intelligence Corps (V), Edinburgh, UK
 24th Intelligence Company, Intelligence Corps (V), London, UK
 Recce Intelligence Centre (Gütersloh), Intelligence Corps, RAF Gütersloh
 Recce Intelligence Centre (Laarbruch), Intelligence Corps, RAF Laarbruch

note 1: units in italics were based in the outside of BAOR's area of operation and would join BAOR upon mobilization.

I Netherlands Corps 

 I Netherlands Corps, Apeldoorn, NL
 Staff and Staff Company, Apeldoorn
 105th Reconnaissance Battalion "Huzaren van Boreel" (Reserve), (18x Leopard 2A4, 48x M113-Command & Reconnaissance)
 305th Commando Battalion, Roosendaal
 101st Military Police Battalion, Wezep
 101st Military Intelligence Company, Apeldoorn
 111th Counterintelligence Detachment, Apeldoorn
 101st Anti-Aircraft Group, Garderen, NL
 Staff and Staff Battery, Garderen
 15th Armored Air-defense Battalion, 't Harde, (supporting 4e Divisie) (27x PRTL, 27x Stinger)
 25th Armored Air-defense Battalion, Ede (supporting 1e Divisie), (27x PRTL, 27x Stinger)
 35th Armored Air-defense Battalion (Reserve) (supporting 5e Divisie), (27x PRTL, 27x Stinger)
 45th Air-defense Battalion (Reserve) (protecting rear area strategic objects), (27x Bofors 40 mm AA guns, 24x Stinger)
 115th Air-defense Battalion (Reserve) (protecting rear area strategic objects), (27x 40mm AA Guns, 24x Stinger)
 125th Air-defense Battalion (Reserve) (protecting rear area strategic objects), (27x 40mm AA Guns, 24x Stinger)
 101st Engineer Combat Group, Wezep, NL
 Staff and Staff Company, Wezep
 11th Engineer Battalion, Wezep
 41st Engineer Battalion, Seedorf
 103rd Engineer Battalion (Reserve)
 462nd Engineer Battalion (Reserve)
 101st NBC-decontamination Company, Wezep
 102nd Construction Equipment Company, Wezep
 104th Medium Girder Bridge Company (Reserve)
 105th Pontoon Bridge Company, Wezep
 107th Dump Truck Company, Wezep
 108th Diver Platoon, Wezep
 201st Engineer Combat Group (Reserve)
 Staff and Staff Company (Reserve)
 102nd Engineer Battalion (Reserve)
 107th Engineer Battalion (Reserve)
 223rd Engineer Battalion (Reserve)
 155th Pontoon Bridge Company (Reserve)
 212th Construction Equipment Company (Reserve)
 227th Dump Truck Company (Reserve)
 109th Diver Platoon (Reserve)
 Light Aviation Group, Deelen, NL
 Staff and Staff Squadron, Deelen
 298th Light Aviation Squadron, Soesterberg, (Alouette III)
 299th Light Aviation Squadron, Deelen, (BO-105C)
 300th Light Aviation Squadron, Deelen, (Alouette III)
 302nd Light Aviation Squadron (Reserve), Soesterberg, (Alouette III)
 Maintenance and Materiel Squadron, Soesterberg
 101st Signal Group, Stroe
 Staff and Staff Detachment, Stroe
 11th Signal Battalion, Arnhem
 41st Signal Battalion, Harderwijk
 106th Signal Battalion, Ede
 108th Signal Battalion, Stroe (supporting I Netherlands Corps)
 107th Radio Company, Stroe, providing Close Air Support teams

1e Divisie 
 1e Divisie "7 December" (Mechanized), Arnhem, NL
 Staff and Staff Company, Arnhem
 102nd Reconnaissance Battalion "Huzaren van Boreel", Amersfoort, (18x Leopard 1V, 48x M113-Command & Reconnaissance)
 11e Pantserinfanteriebrigade, Arnhem, NL
 Staff and Staff Company, Arnhem
 101st Pantser Battalion "Regiment Huzaren Prins Alexander", Soesterberg, (Leopard 1V, 12 YPR-765)
 12th Pantserinfanterie Battalion "Garde Regiment Jagers", Arnhem, (YPR-765, 16x YPR-765 PRAT)
 48th Pantserinfanterie Battalion "Regiment van Heutsz", 's-Hertogenbosch, (YPR-765, 16x YPR-765 PRAT)
 11th Horse Artillery Battalion "Gele Rijders", Arnhem, (M109A3)
 11th Armored Anti-Tank Company, Ermelo, (YPR-765 PRAT)
 11th Armored Engineer Company, Ermelo
 11th Brigade Supply Company, Stroe
 11th Brigade Maintenance Company, Arnhem
 11th Brigade Medical Company, Stroe
 12e Pantserinfanteriebrigade, Vierhouten, NL
 Staff and Staff Company, Vierhouten
 59th Pantser Battalion "Regiment Huzaren Prins van Oranje", 't Harde, (Leopard 1V, 12 YPR-765)
 11th Pantserinfanterie Battalion "Garde Regiment Grenadiers", Arnhem, (YPR-765, 16x YPR-765 PRAT)
 13th Pantserinfanterie Battalion "Garderegiment Fuseliers Prinses Irene", Schalkhaar, (YPR-765, 16x YPR-765 PRAT)
 14th Field Artillery Battalion (Reserve), Vierhouten, (M109A3)
 12th Armored Anti-Tank Company, Vierhouten, (YPR-765 PRAT)
 12th Armored Engineer Company, Vierhouten
 12th Brigade Supply Company, Vierhouten
 12th Brigade Maintenance Company, Uddel
 12th Brigade Medical Company, Vierhouten
 13e Pantserbrigade, Oirschot, NL
 Staff and Staff Company, Oirschot
 11th Pantser Battalion "Regiment Huzaren van Sytzama", Oirschot, (Leopard 1V, 12 YPR-765)
 49th Pantser Battalion (Reserve) "Regiment Huzaren van Sytzama", Oirschot, (Leopard 1V, 12 YPR-765)
 17th Pantserinfanterie Battalion "Regiment Infanterie Chasse", Oirschot, (YPR-765, YPR-765 PRAT)
 12th Field Artillery Battalion, Oirschot, (M109A3)
 13th Armored Engineer Company, Oirschot
 13th Brigade Supply Company, Oirschot
 13th Brigade Maintenance Company, Oirschot
 13th Brigade Medical Company, Oirschot

3rd Panzer Division 
 3rd Panzer Division, Buxtehude
 Staff Company, 3rd Panzer Division, Buxtehude
 7th Panzergrenadier Brigade, Hamburg
 Staff Company, 1st Panzergrenadier Brigade, Hamburg, (M577, Luchs)
 71st Panzergrenadier Battalion, Hamburg, (Leopard 1A5, Marder, M113)
 72nd Panzergrenadier Battalion, Hamburg, (Marder, Panzermörser, M113)
 73rd Panzergrenadier Battalion, Cuxhaven, (Marder, Panzermörser, M113)
 74th Panzer Battalion, Cuxhaven, (Leopard 1A5, M113)
 75th Panzer Artillery Battalion, Hamburg, (M109A3G)
 70th Anti-Tank Company, Cuxhaven, (Jaguar 2)
 70th Armored Engineer Company, Stade
 70th Supply Company, Stade
 70th Maintenance Company, Stade
 8th Panzer Brigade, Lüneburg
 Staff Company, 8th Panzer Brigade, Lüneburg, (8x M577, 8x Luchs)
 81st Panzer Battalion, Lüneburg, (Leopard 2A2, Marder, M113)
 82nd Panzergrenadier Battalion, Lüneburg, (Marder, Panzermörser, M113)
 83rd Panzer Battalion, Lüneburg, (Leopard 2A2, M113)
 84th Panzer Battalion, Lüneburg, (Leopard 2A2, M113)
 85th Panzer Artillery Battalion, Lüneburg, (M109A3G)
 80th Anti-Tank Company, Lüneburg, (Jaguar 1)
 80th Armored Engineer Company, Lüneburg
 80th Supply Company, Lüneburg
 80th Maintenance Company, Lüneburg
 9th Panzer (Lehr) Brigade, Munster
 Staff Company, 9th Panzerlehrbrigade, Munster, (8x M577, 8x Luchs)
 91st Panzer (Lehr) Battalion, Munster, (Leopard 2A2, Marder, M113)
 92nd Panzergrenadier (Lehr) Battalion, Munster, (Marder, Panzermörser, M113)
 93rd Panzer (Lehr) Battalion, Munster, (Leopard 2A2, M113)
 94th Panzer (Lehr) Battalion, Munster, (Leopard 2A2, M113)
 95th Panzer (Lehr) Artillery Battalion, Munster, (M109A3G)
 90th Anti-Tank Training Company, Munster (Jaguar 1)
 90th Armored Engineer Training Company, Munster
 90th Supply Company, Munster
 90th Maintenance Company, Munster
 3rd Artillery Regiment, Stade
 Staff Battery, 3rd Artillery Regiment, Stade
 31st Field Artillery Battalion, Lüneburg (M110A2, FH-70)
 32nd Rocket Artillery Battalion, Dörverden, (LARS, MLRS)
 33rd Surveillance Battalion, Stade, (CL89)
 3rd Custodial Battery, Dörverden
 3rd Armored Reconnaissance Battalion, Lüneburg, (Leopard 1A1A1, Luchs, Fuchs - 9 of which carry a RASIT radar)
 3rd Air Defense Regiment, Hamburg, (Flakpanzer Gepard)
 3rd Engineer Battalion, Stade, (8x Biber AVLB, 8x Pionierpanzer 1, 4x Skorpion Mine Layers, 12x Floating Bridge Modules)
 3rd Army Aviation Squadron, Rotenburg an der Wümme, (Alouette II)
 3rd Signal Battalion, Buxtehude
 3rd Medical Battalion, Hamburg
 3rd Supply Battalion, Stade
 3rd Maintenance Battalion, Rotenburg an der Wümme
 Five Field Replacement Battalions: 31st and 32nd in Zeven, 33rd and 35th in Verden, 34th in Neustadt am Achim
 36th Jäger Battalion (Reserve), Zeven
 37th Jäger Battalion (Reserve), Munster
 38th Security Battalion (Reserve), Zeven
 3rd Signal (Electronic Warfare) Company, Rotenburg an der Wümme
 3rd NBC Defense Company, Munster

4e Divisie 
 4e Divisie, Harderwijk, NL
 Staff and Staff Company, Harderwijk
 103rd Reconnaissance Battalion "Huzaren van Boreel", Seedorf, FRG, (Leopard 2A4, M113-Command & Reconnaissance)
 41 Pantserbrigade, Seedorf, FRG
 Staff and Staff Company, Seedorf
 41st Pantser Battalion "Regiment Huzaren Prins Alexander", Bergen-Hohne, Lower Saxony, (Leopard 2A4, YPR-765)
 43rd Pantser Battalion "Regiment Huzaren van Sytzama", Langemannshof, (Leopard 2A4, YPR-765)
 42nd Pantserinfanterie Battalion "Regiment Limburgse Jagers", Seedorf, (YPR-765, YPR-765 PRAT)
 41st Field Artillery Battalion, Seedorf, (M109A3)
 41st Armored Engineer Company, Seedorf
 41st Brigade Supply Company, Seedorf
 41st Brigade Maintenance Company, Seedorf
 41st Brigade Medical Company, Seedorf
 42e Pantserinfanteriebrigade, Assen, NL
 Staff and Staff Company, Assen
 57th Pantser Battalion (Reserve) "Regiment Huzaren Prins Alexander", Assen, (Leopard 2A4, YPR-765)
 43rd Pantserinfanterie Battalion "Regiment Infanterie Chasse", Assen, (YPR-765, YPR-765 PRAT)
 45th Pantserinfanterie Battalion "Regiment Infanterie Oranje Gelderland", Steenwijk, (70x YPR-765, YPR-765 PRAT)
 42nd Field Artillery Battalion, Assen (M109A3)
 42nd Armored Anti-Tank Company, Darp, (YPR-765 PRAT)
 42nd Armored Engineer Company (Reserve), Assen
 42nd Brigade Supply Company, Vierhouten
 42nd Brigade Maintenance Company, Assen
 42nd Brigade Medical Company, Appingedam
 43e Pantserinfanteriebrigade, Darp, NL
 Staff and Staff Company, Darp
 42nd Pantser Battalion (Reserve) "Regiment Huzaren Prins van Oranje", Darp, (61x Leopard 2A4, YPR-765)
 41st Pantserinfanterie Battalion "Regiment Stootroepen", Ermelo, (YPR-765, YPR-765 PRAT)
 47th Pantserinfanterie Battalion "Regiment Infanterie Menno van Coehoorn", Darp, (YPR-765, YPR-765 PRAT)
 43rd Field Artillery Battalion, Darp (M109A3)
 13th Armored Anti-Tank Company, Oirschot (YPR-765 PRAT)
 43rd Armored Engineer Company, Darp
 43rd Brigade Supply Company, Vierhouten
 43rd Brigade Maintenance Company, Darp
 43rd Brigade Medical Company, Darp

5e Divisie 
 5e Divisie (Reserve), Apeldoorn, NL: Reserve Formation
 Staff and Staff Company, Apeldoorn
 104th Reconnaissance Battalion "Huzaren van Boreel" (Reserve), Apeldoorn, (18x Leopard 1V, 48x M113-Command & Reconnaissance)
 51e Pantserbrigade (Reserve), Stroe, NL
 Staff and Staff Company, Stroe
 12th Pantser Battalion "Regiment Huzaren van Sytzama", Stroe, (52x Leopard 2A4, 12 YPR-765)
 54th Pantser Battalion "Regiment Huzaren van Sytzama", Stroe, (52x Leopard 2A4, 12 YPR-765)
 16th Pantserinfanterie Battalion "Regiment Limburgse Jagers", Stroe, (70x YPR-765, 16x YPR-765 PRAT)
 34th Field Artillery Battalion, Stroe, (20x M109A2)
 51st Armored Engineer Company, Stroe
 51st Brigade Supply Company, Stroe
 51st Brigade Maintenance Company, Stroe
 51st Brigade Medical Company, Stroe
 52e Pantserinfanteriebrigade (Reserve), Arnhem, NL
 Staff and Staff Company, Arnhem
 52nd Pantser Battalion "Regiment Huzaren Prins Alexander", Arnhem, (61x Leopard 1V, 12 YPR-765)
 15th Pantserinfanterie Battalion "Garderegiment Fuseliers Prinses Irene", Arnhem, (70x YPR-765, 16x YPR-765 PRAT)
 44th Pantserinfanterie Battalion "Regiment Infanterie Johan Willem Friso" (active unit), Zuidlaren, (70x YPR-765, 16x YPR-765 PRAT)
 51st Field Artillery Battalion, Arnhem, (20x M109A2)
 52nd Armored Anti-Tank Company, Arnhem, (YPR-765 PRAT)
 52nd Armored Engineer Company, Arnhem
 52nd Brigade Supply Company, Arnhem
 52nd Brigade Maintenance Company, Arnhem
 52nd Brigade Medical Company, Arnhem
 53e Pantserinfanteriebrigade (Reserve), Harderwijk, NL
 Staff and Staff Company, Harderwijk
 58th Pantser Battalion "Regiment Huzaren Prins van Oranje", Harderwijk, (61x Leopard 1V, 12x YPR-765)
 14th Pantserinfanterie Battalion "Regiment Infanterie Chasse", Harderwijk, (70x YPR-765, 16x YPR-765 PRAT)
 46th Pantserinfanterie Battalion "Regiment Infanterie Menno van Coehoorn", Harderwijk, (70x YPR-765, 16x YPR-765 PRAT)
 13th Horse Artillery Battalion, Harderwijk, (20x M109A2)
 53rd Armored Anti-Tank Company, Harderwijk, (YPR-765 PRAT)
 53rd Armored Engineer Company, Harderwijk
 53rd Brigade Supply Company, Harderwijk
 53rd Brigade Maintenance Company, Harderwijk
 53rd Brigade Medical Company, Harderwijk

101e Infanteriebrigade 
 101e Infanteriebrigade (Reserve), Stroe, NL
 Staff and Staff Company, Stroe
 102nd Pantserinfanterie Battalion, (70x YPR-765)
 132nd Pantserinfanterie Battalion, (70x YPR-765)
 142nd Infantry Battalion
 143rd Infantry Battalion

I (NL) Corps Artillery 
 I Corps Artillery, Stroe, NL
 Staff and Staff Company, Stroe
 101st Artillery Surveillance and Target Acquisition Battalion, 't Harde
 425 Mobile Security Infantry Company, 't Harde, to secure the transport and field storage of nuclear warheads for 19th Artillery Battalion
 434 Mobile Security Infantry Company, Darp, to secure the transport and field storage of nuclear warheads for 129th Artillery Battalion
 436 Mobile Security Infantry Company (Reserve), to protect 8th Ammunition Supply Platoon
 437 Mobile Security Infantry Company (Reserve), quick reaction force of I Corps Artillery
 101st Artillery Group, Harderwijk
 Staff and Staff Battery, Harderwijk
 19th Artillery Battalion, (16x M110A2)
 109th Artillery Battalion, (11x M270 MLRS)
 119th Artillery Battalion, (11x M270 MLRS)
 129th Artillery Battalion, Darp, (6x Lance missile launchers)
 8th Ammunition Supply Platoon, Darp, to transport and maintain nuclear ammunition
 102nd Artillery Group, Harderwijk
 Staff and Staff Battery, Harderwijk
 44th Artillery Battalion (Reserve), (20x M109A2)
 54th Artillery Battalion (Reserve), (20x M109A2)
 107th Artillery Battalion, (16x M110A2)
 108th Artillery Battalion (Reserve), (16x M110A2)
 103rd Artillery Group (Reserve), Rhenen
 Staff and Staff Battery, Rhenen
 117th Artillery Battalion (Reserve), (16x M110A2)
 118th Artillery Battalion (Reserve), (16x M110A2)
 154th Artillery Battalion (Reserve), (24x M114/39)
 224th Artillery Battalion (Reserve), (24x M114/39)
 104th Artillery Group (Reserve), Apeldoorn
 Staff and Staff Battery, Apeldoorn
 114th Artillery Battalion (Reserve), (24x M114/39)
 124th Artillery Battalion (Reserve), (24x M114/39)
 134th Artillery Battalion (Reserve), (24x M114/39)
 144th Artillery Battalion (Reserve), (24x M114/39)

I (NL) Corps Logistic Command 
 I Corps Logistic Command, Ermelo
 Staff and Staff Company, Ermelo
 54th Corps Support Battalion (Reserve) (supply, maintenance and medical support for corps' assets)
 111th Corps Support Battalion (Reserve) (supply, maintenance and medical support for corps' assets)
 114th Corps Support Battalion (Reserve) (supply, maintenance and medical support for corps' assets)
 102nd Supply Point Battalion, Ermelo (operating Corps Supply Point Area 5)
 103rd Supply Point Battalion, Stroe (operating Corps Supply Point Area 6)
 258th Supply Point Battalion (Reserve) (operating Corps Supply Point Area 4)
 501st Supply Point Battalion (Reserve) (operating Corps Supply Point Area 7)
 101st Materiel Support Battalion, Nieuw-Milligen (equipment maintenance and spare parts distribution via field workshops and supply points)
 109th Materiel Support Battalion, Naarden (equipment maintenance and spare parts distribution via field workshops and supply points)
 124th Materiel Support Battalion (Reserve) (equipment maintenance and spare parts distribution via field workshops and supply points)
 105th Transport Battalion, Vierhouten
 101st Personnel Replacement Battalion (Reserve)
 601st Materiel Support Platoon Leopard 1V, Vierhouten
 602nd Materiel Support Platoon Leopard 1V (Reserve)
 611th Materiel Support Platoon Leopard 2, Seedorf (supporting the forward deployed Leopard 2 tank battalions of 41 Pantserbrigade)
 612th Materiel Support Platoon Leopard 2 (Reserve)
 501st Materiel Support Platoon PRTL, Ede (supporting the armored air-defense battalions of 101st Anti-Aircraft Group)
 502nd Materiel Support Platoon PRTL, 't Harde (supporting the armored air-defense battalions of 101st Anti-Aircraft Group)
 503rd Materiel Support Platoon PRTL, Hohne (supporting the armored air-defense battalions of 101st Anti-Aircraft Group)
 511th Materiel Support Platoon Light Antiaircraft Artillery (Reserve) (supporting the air-defense battalions of 101st Anti-Aircraft Group)
 512th Materiel Support Platoon Light Antiaircraft Artillery (Reserve) (supporting the air-defense battalions of 101st Anti-Aircraft Group)
 513th Materiel Support Platoon Light Antiaircraft Artillery (Reserve) (supporting the air-defense battalions of 101st Anti-Aircraft Group)
 721st Materiel Support Team Artillery Survey Battalion, 't Harde (equipment maintenance for 101st Artillery Surveillance and Target Acquisition Battalion)
 722nd Materiel Support Team Artillery Survey Battalion, Ede  (electronic equipment maintenance for 101st Artillery Surveillance and Target Acquisition Battalion)
 102nd Medical Group, Ermelo (medical battalions are staff units only, which would be assigned ambulance and corps medical companies, and field hospitals as needed)
 Staff and Staff Detachment, Ermelo
 101st Medical Battalion Staff, (Reserve)
 103rd Medical Battalion Staff, Ermelo
 201st Medical Battalion Staff, (Reserve)
 143rd Medical Supply Point Company
 3x Light Surgical Field Hospital Companies (with 2x platoons each and 3x operating rooms per platoon, treating wounded near the frontline)
 3x Heavy Surgical Field Hospital Battalions (with 18x operating rooms each, treating wounded in the division's rear)
 3x Transit Hospital Battalions, (with 8x operating rooms and 800 beds each, treating wounded destined to be transported back to the Netherlands)
 4x Ambulance Companies (with 72x ambulances each)
 5x Corps Medical Companies (providing first aid services to the corps' assets)

I German Corps 

 I German Corps, Münster
 Staff Company, I German Corps, Münster
 100th Long Range Reconnaissance Company, Braunschweig
 100th Front Intelligence Company, Münster
 4x Field Replacement Battalions: 110th in Greven, 120th in Unna, 130th in Preußisch Oldendorf, 140th in Erwitte
 1st Artillery Command, Münster
 Staff Company, 1st Artillery Command, Münster
 150th Rocket Artillery Battalion, Wesel (6x Lance tactical ballistic missile launcher)
 120th Nuclear Weapons Supply Battalion, Werlte
 100th Security Battalion, Ahaus
 100th UAV Battery, Wesel
 1st Engineer Command, Münster
 Staff Company, 1st Engineer Command, Münster
 110th Combat Engineer Battalion, Minden, (8x Biber armoured vehicle-launched bridge (AVLB), 8x Pionierpanzer 1, 4x Skorpion Mine Layers, 12x Floating Bridge Modules)
 120th Combat Engineer Battalion, Dörverden, (8x Biber AVLB, 8x Pionierpanzer 1, 4x Skorpion Mine Layers, 12x Floating Bridge Modules)
 130th Amphibious Engineer Battalion, Minden
 140th Combat Engineer Battalion, Emmerich am Rhein, (8x Biber AVLB, 8x Pionierpanzer 1, 4x Skorpion Mine Layers, 12x Floating Bridge Modules)
 150th Combat Engineer Battalion (Reserve), Höxter, (8x Biber AVLB, 8x Pionierpanzer 1, 4x Skorpion Mine Layers, 12x Floating Bridge Modules)
 160th Bridging Battalion, Minden
 170th Bridging Battalion (Reserve), Dünsen
 110th NBC Defense Battalion (Reserve, staff active), Emden
 1st Air Defense Command, Münster
 Staff Company, 1st Air Defense Command, Münster
 100th Air Defense Regiment, Wuppertal (36x Roland SAM missile systems mounted Marder 1)
 130th Air Defense Battalion (Reserve), Greven, (24x Bofors 40L70)
 140th Air Defense Battalion (Reserve), Greven, (24x Bofors 40L70)
 1st Army Aviation Command, Rheine
 Staff Company, 1st Army Aviation Command, Rheine, (15x BO-105M)
 10th Army Aviation Regiment, Faßberg, (48x UH-1D helicopters, 5x Alouette II)
 15th Army Aviation Regiment, Rheine, (32x CH-53G, 5x Alouette II)
 16th Army Aviation Regiment, Celle, (56x PAH-1, 5x Alouette II)
 100th Army Aviation Squadron (Reserve), Rheine
 1st Signal Command, Münster
 Staff Company, 1st Signal Command, Münster
 110th Signal Battalion, Coesfeld
 120th Signal Battalion, Rotenburg
 130th Signal Battalion, Coesfeld
 1st Maintenance Command, Bielefeld
 Staff Company, 1st Maintenance Command, Bielefeld
 110th Maintenance Battalion, Coesfeld
 120th Maintenance Battalion, Rheine
 130th Maintenance Battalion (Reserve), Bad Rothenfelde
 1st Supply Command, Rheine
 Staff Company, 1st Supply Command, Rheine
 110th Supply Battalion, Rheine
 170th Transport Battalion, Rheine
 180th Transport Battalion (Reserve), Bad Rothenfelde
 1st Medical Command, Münster
 Staff Company, 1st Medical Command, Münster
 110th Medical Battalion (Reserve), Uedem
 120th Medical Battalion (Reserve), Ochtrup
 130th Medical Transport Battalion (Reserve, staff active), Vechta

1st Panzer Division 
 1st Panzer Division, Hanover
 Staff Company, 1st Panzer Division, Hanover
 1st Panzergrenadier Brigade, Hildesheim
 Staff Company, 1st Panzergrenadier Brigade, Hildesheim, (8x M577, 8x Luchs)
 11th Panzergrenadier Battalion Hildesheim, (13x Leopard 1A5, 24x Marder, 12x M113)
 12th Panzergrenadier Battalion, Osterode am Harz, (24x Marder, 6x Panzermörser, 23x M113)
 13th Panzergrenadier Battalion, Wesendorf, (24x Marder, 6x Panzermörser, 23x M113)
 14th Panzer Battalion, Hildesheim, (41x Leopard 1A5, 12x M113)
 15th Panzer Artillery Battalion, Stadtoldendorf, (18x M109A3G howitzer)
 10th Anti-Tank Company, Hildesheim, (12x Jaguar 2)
 10th Armored Engineer Company, Holzminden
 10th Supply Company, Hildesheim
 10th Maintenance Company, Hildesheim
 2nd Panzer Brigade, all elements at Braunschweig
 Staff Company, 2nd Panzer Brigade, (8x M577, 8x Luchs)
 21st Panzer Battalion, (28x Leopard 2A2, 11x Marder, 12x M113)
 22nd Panzergrenadier Battalion, (35x Marder, 6x Panzermörser, 12x M113)
 23rd Panzer Battalion, (41x Leopard 2A2, 12x M113)
 24th Panzer Battalion, (41x Leopard 2A2, 12x M113)
 25th Panzer Artillery Battalion, (18x M109A3G)
 20th Anti-Tank Company, (12x Jaguar 1)
 20th Armored Engineer Company
 20th Supply Company
 20th Maintenance Company
 3rd Panzer Brigade, Nienburg
 Staff Company, 3rd Panzer Brigade, Nienburg, (8x M577, 8x Luchs)
 31st Panzer Battalion, Nienburg, (28x Leopard 2A2, 11x Marder, 12x M113)
 32nd Panzergrenadier Battalion, Nienburg, (35x Marder, 6x Panzermörser, 12x M113)
 33rd Panzer Battalion, Neustadt am Rübenberge, (41x Leopard 2A2, 12x M113)
 34th Panzer Battalion, Nienburg, (41x Leopard 2A2, 12x M113)
 35th Panzer Artillery Battalion, Neustadt am Rübenberge, (18x M109A3G)
 30th Anti-Tank Company, Neustadt am Rübenberge, (12x Jaguar 1)
 30th Armored Engineer Company, Nienburg
 30th Supply Company, Nienburg
 30th Maintenance Company, Nienburg
 1st Artillery Regiment, Hanover
 Staff Battery, 1st Artillery Regiment, Hanover
 11th Field Artillery Battalion, Hanover, (18x M110A2 howitzer, 18x FH-70 howitzer)
 12th Rocket Artillery Battalion, Nienburg, (16x LARS, 16x M270 Multiple Launch Rocket System (MLRS)
 13th Surveillance Battalion, Wolfenbüttel, (12x CL289 drones)
 1st Custodial Battery, Steyerberg
 1st Armored Reconnaissance Battalion, Braunschweig, (34x Leopard 1A1A1, 10x Luchs, 18x Fuchs - 9 of which carry a RASIT radar)
 1st Air Defense Regiment, Langenhagen, (36x Flakpanzer Gepard)
 1st Engineer Battalion, Holzminden, (8x Biber AVLB, 8x Pionierpanzer 1, 4x Skorpion Mine Layers, 12x Floating Bridge Modules)
 1st Army Aviation Squadron, Celle, (10x Alouette II)
 1st Signal Battalion, Hanover
 1st Medical Battalion, Hildesheim
 1st Supply Battalion, Hanover
 1st Maintenance Battalion, Giesen
 4x Field Replacement Battalions: 11th and 12th in Bad Rothenfelde, 13th in Minden, 15th in Neustadt am Rübenberge
 16th Jäger Battalion (Reserve), Minden
 17th Jäger Battalion (Reserve), Giesen
 18th Security Battalion (Reserve), Giesen
 1st Signal (Electronic Warfare) Company, Dannenberg-Neu Tramm
 1st NBC Defense Company, Emden

7th Panzer Division 
 7th Panzer Division, Unna
 Staff Company, 7th Panzer Division, Unna
 19th Panzergrenadier Brigade, Ahlen
 Staff Company, 19th Panzergrenadier Brigade, Ahlen, (8x M577, 8x Luchs)
 191st Panzergrenadier Battalion, Ahlen, (13x Leopard 1A5, 24x Marder, 12x M113)
 192nd Panzergrenadier Battalion, Ahlen, (24x Marder, 6x Panzermörser, 23x M113)
 193rd Panzergrenadier Battalion, Münster, (24x Marder, 6x Panzermörser, 23x M113)
 194th Panzer Battalion, Münster, (41x Leopard 1A5, 12x M113)
 195th Panzer Artillery Battalion, Münster, (18x M109A3G)
 190th Anti-Tank Company, Münster, (12x Jaguar 2)
 190th Armored Engineer Company, Ahlen
 190th Supply Company, Ahlen
 190th Maintenance Company, Münster
 20th Panzer Brigade, Iserlohn
 Staff Company, 20th Panzer Brigade, Iserlohn, (8x M577, 8x Luchs)
 201st Panzer Battalion, Hemer, (28x Leopard 2A1, 11x Marder, 12x M113)
 202nd Panzergrenadier Battalion, Hemer, (35x Marder, 6x Panzermörser, 12x M113)
 203rd Panzer Battalion, Hemer, (41x Leopard 2A1, 12x M113)
 204th Panzer Battalion, Ahlen, (41x Leopard 2A1, 12x M113)
 205th Panzer Artillery Battalion, Dülmen, (18x M109A3G)
 200th Anti-Tank Company, Wuppertal, (12x Jaguar 1)
 200th Armored Engineer Company, Hemer
 200th Supply Company, Unna
 200th Maintenance Company, Unna
 21st Panzer Brigade, Augustdorf
 Staff Company, 21st Panzer Brigade, Augustdorf, (8x M577, 8x Luchs)
 211th Panzer Battalion, Augustdorf, (28x Leopard 2A1, 11x Marder, 12x M113)
 212th Panzergrenadier Battalion, Augustdorf, (35x Marder, 6x Panzermörser, 12x M113)
 213th Panzer Battalion, Augustdorf, (41x Leopard 2A1, 12x M113)
 214th Panzer Battalion, Augustdorf, (41x Leopard 2A1, 12x M113)
 215th Panzer Artillery Battalion, Augustdorf, (18x M109A3G)
 210th Anti-Tank Company, Augustdorf, (12x Jaguar 1)
 210th Armored Engineer Company, Augustdorf
 210th Supply Company, Augustdorf
 210th Maintenance Company, Augustdorf
 7th Artillery Regiment, Dülmen
 Staff Battery, 7th Artillery Regiment, Dülmen
 71st Field Artillery Battalion, Dülmen, (18x M110A2, 18x FH-70 howitzer)
 72nd Rocket Artillery Battalion, Wuppertal, (16x LARS, 16x MLRS)
 73rd Surveillance Battalion, Dülmen, (12x CL289 drones)
 7th Custodial Battery, Dülmen
 7th Armored Reconnaissance Battalion, Augustdorf, (34x Leopard 1A1A1, 10x Luchs, 18x Fuchs - 9 of which carry a RASIT radar)
 7th Air Defense Regiment, Borken, (36x Gepard)
 7th Engineer Battalion, Höxter, (8x Biber AVLB, 8x Pionierpanzer 1, 4x Skorpion Mine Layers, 12x Floating Bridge Modules)
 7th Army Aviation Squadron, Rheine, (10x Alouette II)
 7th Signal Battalion, Lippstadt
 7th Medical Battalion, Hamm
 7th Supply Battalion, Unna
 7th Maintenance Battalion, Unna
 5x Field Replacement Battalions: 71st and 75th in Paderborn, 72nd and 73rd in Ahlen, 74th in Menden
 76th Jäger Battalion (Reserve), Preußisch Oldendorf
 77th Jäger Battalion (Reserve), Paderborn
 78th Security Battalion (Reserve), Paderborn
 7th Signal (Electronic Warfare) Company, Clausthal-Zellerfeld
 7th NBC Defense Company, Emden

11th Panzergrenadier Division 
 11th Panzergrenadier Division, Oldenburg
 Staff Company, 11th Panzergrenadier Division, Oldenburg
 31st Panzergrenadier Brigade, Oldenburg
 Staff Company, 31st Panzergrenadier Brigade, Oldenburg, (8x M577, 8x Luchs)
 311th Panzergrenadier Battalion, Varel, (13x Leopard 1A5, 24x Marder, 12x M113)
 312th Panzergrenadier Battalion, Delmenhorst, (24x Marder, 6x Panzermörser, 23x M113)
 313th Panzergrenadier Battalion, Varel, (24x Marder, 6x Panzermörser, 23x M113)
 314th Panzer Battalion, Oldenburg (41x Leopard 1A5, 12x M113)
 315th Panzer Artillery Battalion, Wildeshausen, (18x M109A3G)
 310th Anti-Tank Company, Oldenburg, (12x Jaguar 2)
 310th Armored Engineer Company, Delmenhorst
 310th Supply Company, Oldenburg
 310th Maintenance Company, Oldenburg
 32nd Panzergrenadier Brigade, Schwanewede
 Staff Company, 32nd Panzergrenadier Brigade, Schwanewede, (8x M577, 8x Luchs)
 321st Panzergrenadier Battalion, Schwanewede, (13x Leopard 1A1A1, 24x Marder, 12x M113)
 322nd Panzergrenadier Battalion, Schwanewede, (24x Marder, 6x Panzermörser, 23x M113)
 323rd Panzergrenadier Battalion, Schwanewede, (24x Marder, 6x Panzermörser, 23x M113)
 324th Panzer Battalion, Schwanewede, (41x Leopard 1A1A1, 12x M113)
 325th Panzer Artillery Battalion, Schwanewede, (18x M109A3G)
 320th Anti-Tank Company, Schwanewede, (12x Jaguar 2)
 320th Armored Engineer Company, Dörverden
 320th Supply Company, Schwanewede
 320th Maintenance Company, Schwanewede
 33rd Panzer Brigade, Celle
 Staff Company, 33rd Panzer Brigade, Celle, (8x M577, 8x Luchs)
 331st Panzer Battalion, Celle, (28x Leopard 2A1, 11x Marder, 12x M113)
 332nd Panzergrenadier Battalion, Wesendorf, (35x Marder, 6x Panzermörser, 12x M113)
 333rd Panzer Battalion, Celle, (41x Leopard 2A1, 12x M113)
 334th Panzer Battalion, Celle, (41x Leopard 2A1, 12x M113)
 335th Panzer Artillery Battalion, Dedelstorf, (18x M109A3G)
 330th Anti-Tank Company, Dedelstorf, (12x Jaguar 1)
 330th Armored Engineer Company, Dedelstorf
 330th Supply Company, Celle
 330th Maintenance Company, Celle
 11th Artillery Regiment, Oldenburg
 Staff Battery, 11th Artillery Regiment, Oldenburg
 111th Field Artillery Battalion, Oldenburg, (18x M110A2, 18x FH-70)
 112th Rocket Artillery Battalion, Delmenhorst, (16x LARS, 16x MLRS)
 113th Surveillance Battalion, Delmenhorst, (12x CL289 drones)
 11th Custodial Battery, Delmenhorst
 11th Armored Reconnaissance Battalion, Munster, (34x Leopard 1A1A1, 10x Luchs, 18x Fuchs - 9 of which carry a RASIT radar)
 11th Air Defense Regiment, Achim, (36x Gepard)
 11th Engineer Battalion, Dörverden, (8x Biber AVLB, 8x Pionierpanzer 1, 4x Skorpion Mine Layers, 12x Floating Bridge Modules)
 11th Army Aviation Squadron, Rotenburg, (10x Alouette II)
 11th Signal Battalion, Oldenburg
 11th Medical Battalion, Leer
 11th Supply Battalion, Delmenhorst
 11th Maintenance Battalion, Delmenhorst
 5x Field Replacement Battalions: 111th and 112th in Varel, 113th in Oldenburg, 114th in Schwanewede, 115th in Hodenhagen
 116th Jäger Battalion (Reserve), Varel
 117th Jäger Battalion (Reserve), Bremen
 118th Security Battalion (Reserve), Delmenhorst
 11th Signal (Electronic Warfare) Company, Rotenburg an der Wümme
 11th NBC Defense Company, Emden

27th Airborne Brigade 
 27th Airborne Brigade, Lippstadt
 Staff Company, 27th Airborne Brigade, Lippstadt
 271st Airborne Battalion, Iserlohn
 272nd Airborne Battalion, Wildeshausen
 273rd Airborne Battalion, Iserlohn
 274th Airborne Battalion (Reserve), Iserlohn
 270th Airborne Mortar Company, Wildeshausen, (16x 120mm mortars)
 270th Airborne Engineer Company, Minden
 270th Airborne Medical Company, Lippstadt
 270th Airborne Logistics Company, Lippstadt

1 British Corps 

The area 1 BR Corps had to defend lay between Hanover to the north and Kassel to the south and extended from the Inner German Border to the Upper Weser Valley. In case of war, the Corps first line of defence would have been a screening force of 1st The Queen's Dragoon Guards, 16th/5th The Queen's Royal Lancers and 664 Squadron Army Air Corps, which would have become an ad hoc brigade formation under command of BAOR's Brigadier Royal Armoured Corps. Behind the screening force 1st Armoured and 4th Armoured Division would form up. 3rd Armoured Division was to the rear of the two forward deployed division as reserve. 2nd Infantry Division was to defend the Corps Rear Area and prepare a last line of defence along the Western bank of the Weser river.

Units in italics were based in the UK and would join parent organization upon mobilization
 I British Corps, Bielefeld
 1st (BR) Corps HQ Defence Company, Royal Pioneer Corps, Bielefeld
 5th (Volunteer) Btn, Royal Green Jackets, Oxford, UK, 1st British Corps HQ security unit
 Special Air Service Group, Stay Behind Observation Posts and Long Range Reconnaissance Patrol unit
 63 (SAS) Signal Squadron, Royal Signals (V), Thorney Island, UK
 21st Special Air Service Regiment (Artists) (V), Chelsea, UK
 23rd Special Air Service Regiment (V), Birmingham, UK
 Honourable Artillery Company, Finsbury, UK, (Surveillance and Target Acquisition Patrols)
 Screening Force (Corps Border Surveillance Force) - On TTW this brigade would be formed as a reconnaissance/screening force and placed under command of BAOR’s Brigadier RAC.
 1st The Queen's Dragoon Guards, Wolfenbüttel, (48x FV107 Scimitar, 16x FV102 Striker, 20x FV103 Spartan), unit based closest to the inner German border.
 16th/5th Queen's Royal Lancers, Herford, (48x FV107 Scimitar, 16x FV102 Striker, 20x FV103 Spartan)
 664 Squadron AAC, St George's Barracks in Minden, (Reconnaissance), (12x Gazelle AH.1, 3x to each regiment) 
 Commander Royal Artillery 1 (BR) Corps, Bielefeld
 1st Artillery Brigade, Dortmund
 Detachment, 55th Signal Squadron, Royal Signals (V), Liverpool, UK
 5th Heavy Regiment, Royal Artillery, Dortmund, (12x M107, supports 4th Armoured Division)
 32nd Heavy Regiment, Royal Artillery, Dortmund, (12x M107, supports 1st Armoured Division)
 Corps Support Group, Bielefeld
 39th Heavy Regiment, Royal Artillery, Sennelager, (12x M110, re-roling to 24x M270 MLRS from December 1989)
 50 Missile Regiment Royal Artillery, Menden, (12x MGM-52 Lance missile launchers)
 94th Locating Regiment, Royal Artillery, Larkhill, UK, (Target Acquisition), (includes 5th (Gibraltar 1779-83) Field Battery with 6x L118 light guns for AMF (L))
 8th Btn, Queen’s Fusiliers (V), Clapham, UK, 50th Missile Regiment, Royal Artillery, security unit
 266th (Gloucestershire Volunteer Artillery) Observation Post Battery, Royal Artillery (V), Clifton, UK (3x L118 light guns)
 269th (West Riding) Observation Post Battery, Royal Artillery (V), Leeds, UK (3x L118 light guns)
 307th (South Nottinghamshire Hussars Yeomanry, Royal Horse Artillery) Observation Post Battery, Royal Artillery (V), Bulwell, UK (3x L118 light guns)
 Air Defence Group, Dortmund
 12th Air Defence Regiment, Royal Artillery, Dortmund, (24x self-propelled and 24x towed Rapier missile systems)
 16th Air Defence Regiment, Royal Artillery, Kirton in Lindsey, UK, (48x towed Rapier missile systems, 1x Battery supports UKMF/1st Infantry Brigade, 1x Battery supports 3 Commando Brigade, Royal Marines)
 22nd Air Defence Regiment, Royal Artillery, Dortmund, (24x self-propelled and 24x towed Rapier missile systems)
 102nd (Ulster) Air Defence Regiment Royal Artillery (V), Belfast, UK, (32x Javelin)
 104th Air Defence Regiment, Royal Artillery (V), Newport, UK, (64x Javelin)
 105th (Scottish) Air Defence Regiment, Royal Artillery (V), Edinburgh UK, (64x Javelin)
 8th Transport Regiment, Royal Corps of Transport, Münster, supports Heavy, and Missile Regiments
 153 (Highland) Transport Regiment, Royal Corps of Transport (V), Edinburgh, UK, supports the Air Defence Regiments
 Commander Royal Engineers 1 (BR) Corps, Bielefeld
 29th Engineer Brigade (V), Newcastle-on-Tyne, UK - the brigade was planned join I British Corps in Germany within 72 hours of mobilization.
 HQ 29th Engineer Brigade & Signal Troop, Royal Signals, Newcastle-on-Tyne
 71st (Scottish) Engineer Regiment, Royal Engineers (V), Glasgow
 72nd (Tyne Electrical Engineers) Engineer Regiment, Royal Engineers (V), Gateshead
 73rd Engineer Regiment, Royal Engineers (V), Nottingham
 105th (Tyne Electrical Engineers) Plant Squadron, Royal Engineers (V), South Shields
 117th (Highland) Field Support Squadron, Royal Engineers (V), Dundee
 873rd Movement Light Squadron, Royal Engineers (V), Acton, provides lighting for night operations
 29th Engineer Brigade Workshop, Royal Electrical and Mechanical Engineers (V), Newcastle-on-Tyne
 23rd Engineer Regiment, Royal Engineers, Osnabrück
 25th Engineer Regiment, Royal Engineers, Osnabrück
 28th Amphibious Engineer Regiment, Royal Engineers, Hameln, (60x M2D Ferries)
 32nd Armoured Engineer Regiment, Royal Engineers, Munsterlager, (30x FV432, 12x FV103 Spartan, 12x FV180 Combat Engineer Tractor, 27x AVLB, 27x Centurion AVRE)
 43rd Plant Squadron, Royal Engineers, Osnabrück
 65th Corps Support Squadron, Royal Engineers, Hameln, (20x M2 Amphibious Rigs)
 Corps Lighting Troop, Royal Engineers, Herford
 211th Mobile Civilian Artisan Group, Royal Engineers, Horrocks Barracks, Schloss Neuhaus
 256th Mobile Civilian Plant Group, Royal Engineers, Hannover
 1st Postal & Courier Regiment, Royal Engineers, Hannover
 Commander Aviation BAOR and 1 (BR) Corps, Bielefeld
 1 Wing AAC, Hobart Barracks in Detmold, West Germany, (Wing disbanded during 1989)
 1 Regiment AAC, Tofrek Barracks in Hildesheim, supported 1st Armoured Division
 651 Squadron AAC, (Anti-Tank, 4x Gazelle AH.1, 12x Lynx AH.7 (TOW))
 652 Squadron AAC, (Anti-Tank, 4x Gazelle AH.1, 12x Lynx AH.7 (TOW))
 661 Squadron AAC, (Reconnaissance, 12x Gazelle AH.1)
 3 Regiment AAC, Salamanca Barracks in Soest, supported 3rd Armoured Division
 653 Squadron AAC, (Anti-Tank, 4x Gazelle AH.1, 12x Lynx AH.7 (TOW))
 662 Squadron AAC, (Reconnaissance, 12x Gazelle AH.1)
 663 Squadron AAC, (Reconnaissance, 12x Gazelle AH.1)
 4 Regiment AAC, Hobart Barracks in Detmold, supported 4th Armoured Division
 654 Squadron AAC, (Anti-Tank, 4x Gazelle AH.1, 12x Lynx AH.7 (TOW))
 659 Squadron AAC, (Anti-Tank, 4x Gazelle AH.1, 12x Lynx AH.7 (TOW))
 669 Squadron AAC, (Reconnaissance, 12x Gazelle AH.1)
 Commander Communications 1 (BR) Corps, Bielefeld
 7th Signal Regiment, Royal Signals, Herford
 14th Signal Regiment (Electronic Warfare), Royal Signals, Celle
 22nd Signal Regiment, Royal Signals, Lippstadt
 4th (Volunteer) Btn, Worcestershire & Sherwood Foresters, Redditch, UK
 Commander Transport 1 (BR) Corps, Bielefeld
 7th Tank Transporter Regiment, Royal Corps of Transport, Sennelager
 10th Corps Transport Regiment, Royal Corps of Transport, Bielefeld
 24th Transport & Movement Regiment, Royal Corps of Transport, Hanover
 25th Transport & Movement Regiment, Royal Corps of Transport, Bielefeld
 150th (Northumbrian) Transport Regiment, Royal Corps of Transport (V), Hull, UK
 151st (Greater London) Transport Regiment, Royal Corps of Transport (V), Croydon, UK
 152nd (Ulster) Ambulance Regiment, Royal Corps of Transport (V), Belfast, UK
 154th (Lowland) Transport Regiment, Royal Corps of Transport (V), Glasgow, UK
 157th (Wales & Midlands) Transport Regiment, Royal Corps of Transport (V), Cardiff, UK
 162nd Movement Control Regiment, Royal Corps of Transport (V), Grantham, UK
 14th Corps Support Squadron, Royal Corps of Transport, Bielefeld
 Commander Medical 1 (BR) Corps, Bielefeld
 21st Field Hospital, Royal Army Medical Corps, Rinteln (227 Beds)
 32nd Field Hospital, Royal Army Medical Corps, Hannover (145 Beds)
 33rd Field Hospital, Royal Army Medical Corps, Aldershot, UK
 202nd (Midlands) General Hospital, Royal Army Medical Corps (V), Birmingham, UK (800 Beds)
 203rd (Welsh) General Hospital, Royal Army Medical Corps (V), Cardiff, UK (800 Beds)
 204th (North Irish) General Hospital, Royal Army Medical Corps (V), Belfast, UK (800 Beds)
 376 Ophthalmic Team
 211th (Wessex) Field Hospital, Royal Army Medical Corps (V), Barnstaple, UK (400 Beds)
 212th (Yorkshire) Field Hospital, Royal Army Medical Corps (V), Sheffield, UK (400 Beds)
 217th General Hospital, Royal Army Medical Corps (V), Walworth, UK (800 Beds)
 219th (Wessex) Field Hospital, Royal Army Medical Corps (V), Keynsham, UK (400 Beds)
 83rd Field Medical Equipment Depot, Royal Army Medical Corps, Hannover
 Commander Supply 1 (BR) Corps, Bielefeld
 5th Ordnance Battalion, Royal Army Ordnance Corps, Paderborn
 6th Ordnance Battalion, Royal Army Ordnance Corps, Bielefeld
 2nd Aircraft Support Unit, Royal Army Ordnance Corps, Detmold
 Commander Maintenance 1 (BR) Corps, Bielefeld
 1st (BR) Corps Troops Workshop, Royal Electrical and Mechanical Engineers, Bielefeld
 20th Electronics Workshop, Royal Electrical and Mechanical Engineers, Minden
 71st Aircraft Workshop, Royal Electrical and Mechanical Engineers, Detmold
 124th (Tyne Electrical Engineers) Recovery Company, Royal Electrical and Mechanical Engineers (V), Newton Aycliffe, UK
 126th Reclamation Workshop Company, Royal Electrical and Mechanical Engineers (V), Bordon, UK
 133th (Kent) Corps Troops Workshop Company, Royal Electrical and Mechanical Engineers (V), Maidstone, UK
 Provost Marshal 1 (BR) Corps, Bielefeld
 110th Provost Company, Royal Military Police, Sennelager
 115th Provost Company, Royal Military Police, Osnabrück
 116th Provost Company, Royal Military Police (V), Cannock, UK

note 1: December 1989.

1st Armoured Division 
1st Armoured Division was the corps' Northern forward deployed division.
 1st Armoured Division, Verden
 HQ 1st Armoured Division & Signal Regiment, Royal Signals, Verden
 7th Armoured Brigade, Soltau
 HQ 7th Armoured Brigade & 207th Signal Squadron, Royal Signals, Soltau
 Royal Scots Dragoon Guards (Carabiniers and Greys), Fallingbostel, (57x Challenger 1 main battle tanks, 8x FV101 Scorpion armoured reconnaissance vehicles)
 2nd Royal Tank Regiment, Fallingbostel, (57x Challenger 1, 8x FV101 Scorpion)
 1st Btn, Staffordshire Regiment (Prince of Wales's), Fallingbostel, (45x Warrior infantry fighting vehicles, 38x FV432 armoured personnel carriers, 8x FV107 Scimitar, 4x FV103 Spartan, 8x 81mm Mortars)
 12th Armoured Brigade, Osnabrück
 HQ 12th Armoured Brigade & 212th Signal Squadron, Royal Signals, Osnabrück
 4th Royal Tank Regiment, Osnabrück, (57x Chieftain main battle tanks, 8x FV101 Scorpion)
 1st Btn, Royal Irish Rangers, Osnabrück, (79x FV432, 8x FV107 Scimitar, 4x FV103 Spartan, 8x 81mm Mortars)
 1st Btn, Royal Green Jackets, Osnabrück, (79x FV432, 8x FV107 Scimitar, 4x FV103 Spartan, 8x 81mm Mortars)
 4th (Volunteer) Btn, Royal Green Jackets, London, UK
 22nd Armoured Brigade, Bergen-Hohne
 HQ 22nd Armoured Brigade & 201st Signal Squadron, Royal Signals, Bergen-Hohne
 Queen's Own Hussars, Bergen-Hohne, (57x Challenger 1, 8x FV101 Scorpion)
 1st Royal Tank Regiment, Hildesheim, (57x Chieftain, 8x FV101 Scorpion)
 1st Btn, Scots Guards, Bergen-Hohne, (79x FV432, 8x FV107 Scimitar, 4x FV103 Spartan, 8x 81mm Mortars)
 2nd Btn, Royal Anglian Regiment, Celle, (79x FV432, 8x FV107 Scimitar, 4x FV103 Spartan, 8x 81mm Mortars)
 Parachute Regiment Group, Aldershot, UK
 Group HQ & Signals Troop, Royal Signals, Aldershot, UK
 4th (Northern) Btn, Parachute Regiment, Pudsey, UK
 10th (County of London) Btn, Parachute Regiment, Chelsea, UK
 15th (Scottish Volunteer) Btn, Parachute Regiment, Glasgow, UK
 Commander Royal Artillery 1st Armoured Division, Bergen-Hohne
 1st Field Regiment, Royal Horse Artillery, Bergen-Hohne, (24x Abbot howitzers)
 4th Field Regiment, Royal Artillery, Osnabrück, (24x M109A2 howitzer)
 40th Field Regiment, Royal Artillery, Bergen-Hohne, (24x M109A2)
 10th (Assaye) Air Defence Battery, (36x Javelin SAM)
 21st Engineer Regiment, Royal Engineers, Nienburg, (30x FV432, 12x FV103 Spartan, 12x FV180 Combat Engineer Tractor, and 12x Armoured vehicle-launched bridges)
 1st Armoured Division Transport Regiment, Royal Corps of Transport, Bunde
 1st Ordnance Battalion, Royal Army Ordnance Corps, Verden
 7th Armoured Workshop, Royal Electrical and Mechanical Engineers, Fallingbostel
 12th Armoured Workshop, Royal Electrical and Mechanical Engineers, Osnabrück
 1st Armoured Field Ambulance, Royal Army Medical Corps, Bergen-Hohne
 2nd Armoured Field Ambulance, Royal Army Medical Corps, Osnabrück
 220th (1st Home Counties) Field Ambulance, Royal Army Medical Corps (V), Maidstone, UK
 111th Provost Company, Royal Military Police, Bergen-Hohne

2nd Infantry Division 
2nd Infantry Division was based in the North East of the United Kingdom and was planned to have joined I British Corps in Germany within 72 hours of mobilization. The division was tasked with defending the Corps Rear Area and prepare a last line of defense along the Western bank of the Weser River. Therefore, the 29th Engineer Brigade was added to the division and was tasked with route maintenance and preparation of defensive positions on the western bank of the Weser River in the Upper Weser Valley.
 2nd Infantry Division, York, based in the United Kingdom.
 HQ 2nd Infantry Division & Signal Regiment, Royal Signals, York
 15th (North East) Infantry Brigade, Alanbrooke Barracks, Topcliffe
 HQ 15th Infantry Brigade & Signal Troop (V), Royal Signals, Topcliffe
 Queen's Own Yeomanry, Newcastle upon Tyne, (reconnaissance regiment with 80x FV721 Fox, 20x Spartan)
 1st (Cleveland) Btn, Yorkshire Volunteers (V), York
 2nd (Yorkshire & Humberside) Btn, Yorkshire Volunteers (V), York
 6th (Volunteer) Btn, Royal Regiment of Fusiliers (V), Newcastle upon Tyne
 7th (Durham) Btn, The Light Infantry (V), Durham
 8th (Yorkshire) Btn, The Light Infantry (V), Wakefield
 24th Airmobile Brigade, Catterick
 HQ 24th Airmobile Brigade & 210th Signal Squadron, Royal Signals, Catterick
 1st Btn, Green Howards (Alexandra, Princess of Wales's Own Yorkshire Regiment), Catterick
 1st Btn, Prince of Wales's Own Regiment of Yorkshire, Catterick
 3rd Btn, The Light Infantry, Blackpool, (43x Saxon, 8x FV721 Fox, 8x 81mm Mortars)
 9 Regiment Army Air Corps, RAF Topcliffe
 No. 672 Squadron AAC, (Lynx Light Battlefield Helicopter Squadron, activated 1 January 1990, 12x Lynx AH.9)
 No. 3 Flight AAC, (4x Gazelle AH.1)
 51st Field Squadron (Air Mobile), Royal Engineers, Ripon, from 38th Engineer Regiment, Royal Engineers
 24th (Airmobile) Field Ambulance, Royal Army Medical Corps, Catterick
 29th Engineer Brigade (V), Newcastle-on-Tyne
 HQ 29th Engineer Brigade & Signal Troop, Royal Signals, Newcastle-on-Tyne
 71st (Scottish) Engineer Regiment, Royal Engineers (V), Glasgow
 72 (Tyne Electrical Engineers) Engineer Regiment, Royal Engineers (V), Gateshead
 73rd Engineer Regiment, Royal Engineers (V), Nottingham
 105th (Tyne Electrical Engineers) Plant Squadron, Royal Engineers (V), South Shields
 117th (Highland) Field Support Squadron, Royal Engineers (V), Dundee
 873rd Movement Light Squadron, Royal Engineers (V), Acton, provides lighting for night operations
 29th Engineer Brigade Workshop, Royal Electrical and Mechanical Engineers (V), Newcastle-on-Tyne
 49th (Eastern) Infantry Brigade, Chilwell
 HQ 49th Infantry Brigade & Signal Troop (V), Royal Signals, Chilwell
 Royal Yeomanry, Chelsea, (Armoured reconnaissance with 80x FV721 Fox, 20x Spartan)
 3rd (Volunteer) Btn, Staffordshire Regiment (Prince of Wales's) (V), Wolverhampton
 5th (Volunteer) Btn, Royal Regiment of Fusiliers (V), Coventry
 5th (Shropshire and Herefordshire) Btn, The Light Infantry (V), Shrewsbury
 5th (Volunteer) Btn, Royal Anglian Regiment (V), Peterborough
 7th (Volunteer) Btn, Royal Anglian Regiment (V), Leicester
 Commander Royal Artillery 2nd Infantry Division, York
 27th Field Regiment, Royal Artillery, Topcliffe, (18x FH-70), supports 24th Airmobile Brigade
 100th (Yeomanry) Field Regiment, Royal Artillery (V), London, (24x L118 light guns), supports 49th Infantry Brigade
 101st (Northumbrian) Field Regiment, Royal Artillery (V), Newcastle upon Tyne, (24x L118 light guns), supports 15th Infantry Brigade
 103rd (Lancashire Artillery Volunteers) Air Defence Regiment, Royal Artillery (V), Liverpool, (64x Javelin)
 2nd Transport Regiment, Royal Corps of Transport, Catterick
 2nd Ordnance Battalion, Royal Army Ordnance Corps, Catterick
 15th Field Workshop, Royal Electrical and Mechanical Engineers, Catterick
 15th Field Support Squadron, Royal Engineers, Ripon, from 38th Engineer Regiment, Royal Engineers
 250th (Hull) Field Ambulance, Royal Army Medical Corps (V), Grimsby
 251st (Sunderland) Field Ambulance, Royal Army Medical Corps (V), Sunderland
 254th (City of Cambridge) Field Ambulance, Royal Army Medical Corps (V), Cambridge
 No. 655 Squadron AAC, Northern Ireland Regiment AAC, AAC Ballykelly, (Anti-tank, 4x Gazelle AH.1, 12x Lynx AH.7)
 150th Provost Company, Royal Military Police, Catterick

3rd Armoured Division 
3rd Armoured Division was the corps' reserve formation.
 3rd Armoured Division, Soest
 HQ 3rd Armoured Division & Signal Regiment, Royal Signals, Soest
 4th Armoured Brigade, Münster
 HQ 4th Armoured Brigade & 204th Signal Squadron, Royal Signals, Münster
 14th/20th King's Hussars, Münster, (57x Challenger 1, 8x FV101 Scorpion), one squadron detached to Berlin Infantry Brigade
 17th/21st Lancers, Münster, (57x Challenger 1, 8x FV101 Scorpion), one squadron detached to British Forces Cyprus
 1st Btn, Grenadier Guards, Münster, (45x Warrior, 38x FV432, 8x FV107 Scimitar, 4x FV103 Spartan, 8x 81mm Mortars)
 6th Armoured Brigade, Soest
 HQ 6th Armoured Brigade & 206th Signal Squadron, Royal Signals, Soest
 3rd Royal Tank Regiment, Hemer, (56x Challenger 1, 8x FV101 Scorpion)
 1st Btn, Royal Scots (The Royal Regiment), Werl, (45x Warrior, 38x FV432, 8x FV107 Scimitar, 4x FV103 Spartan, 8x 81mm Mortars)
 3rd Btn, Royal Regiment of Fusiliers, Hemer, (45x Warrior, 38x FV432, 8x FV107 Scimitar, 4x FV103 Spartan, 8x 81mm Mortars)
 33rd Armoured Brigade, Paderborn
 HQ 33rd Armoured Brigade & 202nd Signal Squadron, Royal Signals, Paderborn
 Blues and Royals (Royal Horse Guards and 1st Dragoons), Sennelager, (57x Challenger 1, 8x FV101 Scorpion)
 1st Btn, Queen's Own Highlanders, Münster, (79x FV432, 8x FV107 Scimitar, 4x FV103 Spartan, 8x 81mm Mortars)
 1st Btn, Queen's Lancashire Regiment, Paderborn, (79x FV432, 8x FV107 Scimitar, 4x FV103 Spartan, 8x 81mm Mortars)
 Commander Royal Artillery 3rd Armoured Division, Münster
 2nd Field Regiment, Royal Artillery, Münster, (24x M109A2)
 46th (Talavera) Air Defence Battery, (36x Javelin)
 3rd Field Regiment, Royal Horse Artillery, Paderborn, (24x Abbot howitzers)
 49th Field Regiment, Royal Artillery, Lippstadt, (24x M109A2)
 9th/12th Royal Lancers (Prince of Wales’s), Wimbish, UK, (24x FV101 Scorpion, 24x FV107 Scimitar, 16x FV102 Striker, 19x FV103 Spartan)
 26th Engineer Regiment, Royal Engineers, Iserlohn, (30x FV432, 12x Spartan, 12x FV180, and 12x AVLB)
 3rd Armoured Division Transport Regiment, Royal Corps of Transport, Duisburg
 3rd Ordnance Battalion, Royal Army Ordnance Corps, Soest
 5th Armoured Workshop, Royal Electrical and Mechanical Engineers, Soest
 6th Armoured Workshop, Royal Electrical and Mechanical Engineers, Münster
 11th Armoured Workshop, Royal Electrical and Mechanical Engineers, Soest
 3rd Armoured Field Ambulance, Royal Army Medical Corps, Sennelager
 5th Armoured Field Ambulance, Royal Army Medical Corps, Münster
 221st (2nd Home Counties) Field Ambulance, Royal Army Medical Corps (V), Kingston-upon-Thames, UK
 113th Provost Company, Royal Military Police, Werl

note 2: units in italics were based in the UK and would join 1st Armoured Division upon mobilization.

4th Armoured Division 
4th Armoured Division was the Corps' Southern forward deployed division. As the division's area of operation was hilly and woody, 19th Infantry Brigade was added to it.
 4th Armoured Division, Herford, FRG
 HQ 4th Armoured Division & Signal Regiment, Royal Signals, Herford
 11th Armoured Brigade, Minden, FRG
 HQ 11th Armoured Brigade & 211th Signal Squadron, Royal Signals, Minden
 5th Royal Inniskilling Dragoon Guards, Paderborn, (57x Chieftain, 8x FV101 Scorpion)
 1st Btn, Argyll and Sutherland Highlanders, Minden, (79x FV432, 8x FV107 Scimitar, 4x FV103 Spartan, 8x 81mm Mortars)
 2nd Btn, Queen's Regiment, Minden, (79x FV432, 8x FV107 Scimitar, 4x FV103 Spartan, 8x 81mm Mortars)
 1st Btn, 51st Highland Volunteers (V), Perth, UKnote 2
 19th Infantry Brigade, Colchester, England - the brigade would join 4th Armoured Division within 48 hours of receiving marching orders.
 HQ 19th Infantry Brigade & 209th Signal Squadron, Royal Signals, Colchester
 Royal Hussars (Prince of Wales Own), Tidworth, (57x Chieftain, 8x FV101 Scorpion), one squadron detached to UKMF/1st Infantry Brigade
 1st Btn, King's Own Royal Border Regiment, Colchester, (43x Saxon, 8x FV721 Fox, 8x 81mm Mortars)
 1st Btn, Royal Anglian Regiment, Colchester, (43x Saxon, 8x FV721 Fox, 8x 81mm Mortars)
 3rd Btn, Royal Anglian Regiment, Colchester, (43x Saxon, 8x FV721 Fox, 8x 81mm Mortars)
 34th Field Squadron, Royal Engineers, Waterbeach, from 39th Engineer Regiment, Royal Engineers
 657 Squadron AAC, Colchester, (Anti-Tank, 4x Gazelle AH.1, 12x Lynx AH.7)
 20th Armoured Brigade, Detmold, FRG
 HQ 20th Armoured Brigade & 200th Signal Squadron, Royal Signals, Detmold
 4th/7th Royal Dragoon Guards, Detmold, (57x Chieftain, 8x FV101 Scorpion)
 15th/19th King's Royal Hussars, Detmold, (57x Chieftain, 8x FV101 Scorpion)
 2nd Btn, Royal Irish Rangers, Lemgo, (79x FV432, 8x FV107 Scimitar, 4x FV103 Spartan, 8x 81mm Mortars)
 5th (Volunteer) Btn, Queen's Regiment (V), Canterbury, UK
 Commander Royal Artillery 4th Armoured Division, Paderborn
 19th Field Regiment, Royal Artillery, Dortmund, (24x Abbot self-propelled howitzers)
 26th Field Regiment, Royal Artillery, Gütersloh, (24x Abbot howitzers)
 43rd (Lloyd's Company) Air Defence Battery, (36x Javelin)
 45th Field Regiment, Royal Artillery, Colchester, UK, (18x FH70 towed howitzers), supports 19th Infantry Brigade
 35th Engineer Regiment, Royal Engineers, Hamlen, (30x FV432, 12x Spartan, 12x FV180 Combat Engineer Tractor, and 12x AVLB)
 4th Armoured Division Transport Regiment, Royal Corps of Transport, Minden
 4th Ordnance Battalion, Royal Army Ordnance Corps, Herford
 4th Armoured Workshop, Royal Electrical and Mechanical Engineers, Detmold
 8th Field Workshop, Royal Electrical and Mechanical Engineers, Colchester, UK
 4th Armoured Field Ambulance, Royal Army Medical Corps, Minden
 19th Field Ambulance, Royal Army Medical Corps, Colchester, UK
 222nd (East Midlands) Field Ambulance, Royal Army Medical Corps (V), Leicester, UK
 223rd (Durham) Field Ambulance, Royal Army Medical Corps (V), Newton Aycliffe, UK
 114th Provost Company, Royal Military Police, Detmold

note 2: units in italics were based in the UK and would join 4th Armoured Division upon mobilization.

I Belgian Corps 

 I (BE) Corps, Cologne, Federal Republic of Germany
 Corps Reconnaissance Command (COMRECCE), Arolsen
 Staff Company, Arolsen
 1ste Jagers te Paard, Arolsen, (authorized for 24x Scimitar, 24x Scorpion, 12x Striker, 12x Spartan vehicles, Sultan, Samaritan, Samson)
 2de Jagers te Paard, Lüdenscheid, (37x Leopard 1, 7x M113, 4x Scimitar, 1x Bergepanzer 2)
 4e Chasseurs à Cheval, Arnsberg, (24x Scimitar, 24x Scorpion, 12x Striker, 12x Spartan, 4x Sultan, 4x Samaritan, 1x Samson)
 1er Compagnie d’Equipes Spéciales de Reconnaissance (ESR), Troisdorf, (Long-range reconnaissance patrol)
 210th Logistic Company, Arolsen
 Corps Artillery Command, Cologne
 Staff Company, Cologne
 3rd Artillery Regiment, Werl, (4x Lance missile launchers)
 13th Artillery Regiment, Büren, (Ammunition supply)
 14th Anti-Air Artillery Battalion, Spich, (27x Gepard self-propelled anti-aircraft guns)
 17th Horse Artillery Regiment, Altenrath, (24x M109A2 155mm self-propelled howitzers)
 18th Artillery Regiment, Brasschaat, (24x M109A2 155mm self-propelled howitzers)
 20th Artillery Regiment, Werl, (12x M110A2 203mm 155mm self-propelled howitzers)
 35th Anti-Air Artillery Battalion, Spich, (27x Gepard self-propelled anti-aircraft guns)
 73rd Special Ammunition Battery, Soest
 80th Observation and Surveillance Battery, Cologne
 95th Hawk and Lance Maintenance Battery, Werl
 1st Light Aviation Group, Cologne
 Staff and Services Company, Cologne
 16th Light Aviation Squadron, Cologne, (10x Alouette II, 3x BN-2A)
 17th Light Aviation Squadron, Werl, (10x Alouette II, 3x BN-2A)
 18th Light Aviation Squadron, Merzbrück, (10x Alouette II, 3x BN-2A)
 1st Engineer Group, Cologne
 Staff Company, Cologne
 1st Engineer Regiment, Cologne, (two field engineer companies, one M48AVLB armoured vehicle-launched bridge and one NBC-defense company)
 3rd Bridge Engineer Regiment, Cologne, (with three Mobile Floating Assault Bridge (MOFAB) companies)
 6th Engineer Regiment, Cologne, (two field engineer companies, one M48AVLB armoured vehicle-launched bridge and one nuclear demolition company)
 10th Field Engineer Regiment, Amay, Belgium (three field engineer companies)
 17th Field Engineer Regiment, Zwijndrecht, Belgium (three field engineer companies)
 Topography and Geography Company, Cologne
 1st Signal Group, Cologne
 Staff Company, Cologne
 4th Signal Battalion (Corps Headquarters), Cologne
 6th Signal Battalion, Lüdenscheid
 13th Signal Company, Krefeld, (supports Headquarters Northern Army Group)
 17th Signal Company, Cologne
 20th Signal Company, Cologne, (Air Support)
 4th Logistic Battalion, Cologne
 18th Logistic Battalion, Lüdenscheid
 20th Logistic Battalion, Cologne
 29th Logistic Battalion, Eschweiler
 51st Logistic Battalion, Aachen
 2nd Military Police Company, Arnsberg
 6th Military Police Company, Cologne
 7th Military Police Company, Liège
 1st Ambulance Company, Soest
 2nd Ambulance Company, Cologne
 3rd Ambulance Company, Cologne

1er Division d'Infanterie 
 1er Division d'Infanterie, Liège, Belgium
 Headquarters and Signal Company, Liège
 1ste Pantserinfanteriebrigade, Leopoldsburg, Belgium
 1st Staff Company, Leopoldsburg
 2de Regiment Lansiers, Leopoldsburg, (37x Leopard 1, 7x M113, 4x Scimitar, 1x Bergepanzer 2)
 1ste Regiment Karabiniers, Leopoldsburg, (42x AIFV-B-C25, 4x AIFV-B-MILAN, 3x AIFV-B-CP, 4x Scimitar, 4x Kanonenjagdpanzer, 4x M30 107mm mortars)
 Bevrijding Bataljon, Leopoldsburg, (42x AIFV-B-C25, 4x AIFV-B-MILAN, 3x AIFV-B-CP, 4x Scimitar, 4x Kanonenjagdpanzer, 4x M30 107mm mortars)
 2de Regiment Artillerie, Helchteren, (16x M109A2 155mm self-propelled howitzers)
 13th Anti-tank Company, (12x Kanonenjagdpanzer, 12x AIFV-B-MILAN)
 68th Engineer Company, (10x M113)
 1st Maintenance Company
 1st Supply and Transport Company
 1st Medical Company
 7ème Brigade d'Infanterie Blindée, Marche-en-Famenne, Belgium
 7th Staff Company, Marche-en-Famenne
 1er Régiment de Lanciers, Marche-en-Famenne, (37x Leopard 1, 7x M113, 4x Scimitar, 1x Bergepanzer 2)
 1er Régiment de Chasseurs Ardennais, Marche-en-Famenne, (42x AIFV-B-C25, 4x AIFV-B-MILAN, 3x AIFV-B-CP, 4x Scimitar, 4x Kanonenjagdpanzer, 4x M30 107mm mortars)
 12e Régiment de Ligne "Prince Léopold", Spa, (42x AIFV-B-C25, 4x AIFV-B-MILAN, 3x AIFV-B-CP, 4x Scimitar, 4x Kanonenjagdpanzer, 4x M30 107mm mortars)
 1er Régiment d'Artillerie, Bastogne, (16x M109A2 155mm self-propelled howitzers)
 8th Anti-tank Company, (12x Kanonenjagdpanzer, 12x AIFV-B-MILAN)
 67th Engineer Company, (10x M113)
 7th Maintenance Company
 7th Supply and Transport Company
 7th Medical Company
 12ème Brigade d'Infanterie (Reserve), Liège, Belgium
 12th Staff Company, Liège
 3e Régiment de Lanciers, Altenrath, (active unit forward deployed to Germany, (37x Leopard 1, 7x M113, 4x Scimitar, 1x Bergepanzer 2)
 2ème Régiment de Chasseurs Ardennais, Bastogne, (42x AIFV-B-C25, 4x AIFV-B-MILAN, 3x AIFV-B-CP, 4x Scimitar, 4x Kanonenjagdpanzer, 4x M30 107mm mortars)
 3e Régiment Carabines, Liège, (42x AIFV-B-C25, 4x AIFV-B-MILAN, 3x AIFV-B-CP, 4x Scimitar, 4x Kanonenjagdpanzer, 4x M30 107mm mortars)
 15e Régiment d'Artillerie, (16x M109A2 155mm self-propelled howitzers)
 12th Reconnaissance Company
 12th Anti-tank Company, (12x Kanonenjagdpanzer, 12x AIFV-B-MILAN)
 12th Engineer Company, (10x M113)
 12th Maintenance Company
 12th Supply and Transport Company
 12th Medical Company

16de Pantserdivisie 
 16de Pantserdivisie, Neheim-Hüsten
 Headquarters and Signal Company, Neheim-Hüsten
 4de Pantserinfanteriebrigade, Soest
 4th Staff Company, Soest
 4de Regiment Lansiers, Soest, (37x Leopard 1, 7x M113, 4x Scimitar, 1x Bergepanzer 2)
 1ste Regiment Grenadiers, Soest, (42x AIFV-B-C25, 4x AIFV-B-MILAN, 3x AIFV-B-CP, 4x Scimitar, 4x Kanonenjagdpanzer, 4x M30 107mm mortars)
 5de Linieregiment, Soest, (42x AIFV-B-C25, 4x AIFV-B-MILAN, 3x AIFV-B-CP, 4x Scimitar, 4x Kanonenjagdpanzer, 4x M30 107mm mortars)
 6de Regiment Artillerie, Soest (16x M109A2 155mm self-propelled howitzers)
 9th Anti-tank Company, Soest, (12x Kanonenjagdpanzer, 12x AIFV-B-MILAN)
 14th Engineer Company, Arolsen, (10x M113)
 4th Maintenance Company, Werl
 4th Supply and Transport Company, Soest
 4th Medical Company, Soest
 17ème Brigade Blindée, Siegen
 17th Staff Company, Siegen
 1er Régiment des Guides, Siegen, (37x Leopard 1, 7x M113, 4x Scimitar, 1x Bergepanzer 2)
 2e Regiment Gidsen, Altenrath, (37x Leopard 1, 7x M113, 4x Scimitar, 1x Bergepanzer 2)
 1ste Regiment Karabiniers Wielrijders, Spich, (42x AIFV-B-C25, 4x AIFV-B-MILAN, 3x AIFV-B-CP, 4x Scimitar, 4x Kanonenjagdpanzer, 4x M30 107mm mortars)
 2ème Régiment de Carabiniers-cyclistes, Siegen, (42x AIFV-B-C25, 4x AIFV-B-MILAN, 3x AIFV-B-CP, 4x Scimitar, 4x Kanonenjagdpanzer, 4x M30 107mm mortars)
 19e Régiment d'Artillerie à Cheval, Siegen, (16x M109A2 155mm self-propelled howitzers)
 2nd Anti-tank Company, Siegen, (12x Kanonenjagdpanzer, 12x AIFV-B-MILAN)
 15th Engineer Company, Cologne, (10x M113)
 17th Maintenance Company, Siegen
 17th Supply and Transport Company, Siegen
 17th Medical Company, Siegen
 10e Pantserinfanteriebrigade (Reserve), Limbourg, Belgium
 10th Staff Company, Limbourg
 8de Regiment Lansiers, Limbourg, (37x Leopard 1, 7x M113, 4x Scimitar, 1x Bergepanzer 2)
 2de Regiment Karabiniers, Limbourg, (42x AIFV-B-C25, 4x AIFV-B-MILAN, 3x AIFV-B-CP, 4x Scimitar, 4x Kanonenjagdpanzer, 4x M30 107mm mortars)
 4de Linieregiment, Limbourg, (42x AIFV-B-C25, 4x AIFV-B-MILAN, 3x AIFV-B-CP, 4x Scimitar, 4x Kanonenjagdpanzer, 4x M30 107mm mortars)
 74de Regiment Artillerie, (16x M109A2 155mm self-propelled howitzers)
 10th Reconnaissance Company
 10th Anti-tank Company, (12x Kanonenjagdpanzer, 12x AIFV-B-MILAN)
 10th Engineer Company, (10x M113)
 10th Maintenance Company, Siegen
 10th Supply and Transport Company, Siegen
 10th Medical Company, Siegen

Northern Territorial Command 
The German Northern Territorial Command (Territorialkommando Nord), headquartered in Mönchengladbach, was a corps-sized command responsible for NORTHAG's Rear Combat Zone, which extended from the Belgian and Dutch border to approximately the middle of Northern West Germany. The Command's tasks were to ensure an uninterrupted flow of war materiel to allied forces fighting in the Combat Zone and to provide hospital care for wounded troops.

III US Corps 

 III US Corps HQ, Fort Hood, TX
 Headquarters and Headquarters Company
 3rd Personnel Group
 3rd Finance Group
 Army Band
 6th Cavalry Brigade (Air Combat), Fort Hood, TX
 Headquarters and Headquarters Company
 1st Squadron, 6th Cavalry, (18x AH-64, 13x OH-58C, 3x UH-60A)
 3rd Squadron, 6th Cavalry, (18x AH-64, 13x OH-58C, 3x UH-60A)
 6th Squadron, 6th Cavalry, (18x AH-64, 13x OH-58C, 3x UH-60A - activated 6 June 1990)
 7th Squadron, 6th Cavalry, (18x AH-64, 13x OH-58C, 3x UH-60A - US Army Reserve unit at Conroe-North Houston Airport)
 2nd Battalion, 58th Aviation (Air Traffic Control)
 2nd Battalion, 158th Aviation, (32x CH-47D)
 31st Air Defense Artillery Brigade, Fort Hood, TX
 Headquarters and Headquarters Battery
 3rd Battalion, 1st Air Defense Artillery, Fort Bliss, (24x MIM-23 Hawk, 8x FIM-92 Stinger)
 2nd Battalion, 2nd Air Defense Artillery, (24x MIM-72 Chaparral, 24x M163 VADS Vulcan, 15x FIM-92 Stinger)
 2nd Battalion, 7th Air Defense Artillery, Fort Bliss, (48x MIM-104 Patriot)
 1st Battalion, 200th Air Defense Artillery, (New Mexico Army National Guard), (24x MIM-72 Chaparral, 24x M163 VADS Vulcan, 15x FIM-92 Stinger)
 1st Battalion, 233rd Air Defense Artillery, (Arkansas Army National Guard), (24x MIM-72 Chaparral, 24x M163 VADS Vulcan, 15x FIM-92 Stinger)
 89th Military Police Brigade, Fort Hood, TX
 Headquarters and Headquarters Company
 716th Military Police Battalion, Fort Riley, KS
 720th Military Police Battalion
 3rd Signal Brigade (Corps), Fort Hood, TX
 Headquarters and Headquarters Company
 16th Signal Battalion (Command Operations)
 57th Signal Battalion (Corps Area)
 136th Signal Battalion (Corps Radio) (Arkansas Army National Guard)
 504th Military Intelligence Brigade, Fort Hood, TX
 Headquarters and Headquarters Detachment
 15th Military Intelligence Battalion (Aerial Exploitation), (6x RU-21H, 10x OV-1D)
 163rd Military Intelligence Battalion (Tactical Exploitation)
 303rd Military Intelligence Battalion (Operations)

1st Cavalry Division 

 1st Cavalry Division, Ft. Hood, TX, Operation Reforger unit. POMCUS depots in Belgium (Grobbendonk, Zutendaal) and the Netherlands (Brunssum, Eygelshoven) and ammunition depot in Zutendaal in Belgium.
 Headquarters and Headquarters Troop
 1st Cavalry Division Band
 1st Brigade
 Headquarters and Headquarters Troop
 3rd Battalion, 32nd Armor, (M1 Abrams)
 2nd Squadron, 8th Cavalry, (M1 Abrams)
 2nd Squadron, 5th Cavalry, (M2 Bradley)
 2nd Brigade
 Headquarters and Headquarters Troop
 1st Battalion, 32nd Armor, (M1 Abrams)
 1st Squadron, 8th Cavalry, (M1 Abrams)
 1st Squadron, 5th Cavalry, (M2 Bradley)
 155th Armored Brigade, (Mississippi Army National Guard), Tupelo, MS
 Headquarters and Headquarters Company
 1st Battalion, 198th Armor, (M1 Abrams)
 2nd Battalion, 198th Armor, (M1 Abrams)
 3rd Battalion, 141st Infantry, (Texas Army National Guard), (M2 Bradley)
 1st Battalion, 155th Infantry, (M2 Bradley)
 2nd Battalion, 114th Field Artillery, (24x M109A3)
 106th Support Battalion (Forward)
 Troop A, 98th Cavalry, (9x M1 Abrams, 13x M3 Bradley)
 Engineer Company
 Air Defense Battery
 4th Brigade (Aviation)
 Headquarters and Headquarters Troop
 1st Squadron, 7th Cavalry, (40x M3A1 Bradley CFV, 10x M113, 6x M106A2, 4x M577, 8x AH-1F, 12x OH-58C, 2x UH-1H)
 1st Battalion, 227th Aviation, (18x Boeing AH-64 Apache, 13x OH-58C, 3x UH-1H)
 Company D, 227th Aviation, (6x UH-1H, 6x OH-58C, 6x OH-58D Kiowa, 3x EH-60A)
 Company E, 227th Aviation, (15x UH-60A Blackhawk)
 1st Cavalry Division Artillery (DIVARTY)
 Headquarters and Headquarters Battery
 1st Battalion, 82nd Field Artillery, (24x M109A3)
 3rd Battalion, 82nd Field Artillery, (24x M109A3)
 Battery A, 21st Field Artillery, (9x M270 MLRS)
 Battery A, 333rd Field Artillery, (Target Acquisition)
 1st Cavalry Division Support Command (DISCOM)
 Headquarters and Headquarters Company
 15th Support Battalion (Forward)
 27th Support Battalion (Main)
 115th Support Battalion (Forward)
 Company F, 227th Aviation
 4th Battalion, 5th Air Defense Artillery, (12x MIM-72 Chaparral, 27x M163 VADS Vulcan, 60x FIM-92 Stinger)
 8th Engineer Battalion, (8x M60 AVLB, 8x M728 Engineer Vehicle, 4x M88 Recovery Vehicle, 12x Mabey Logistic Support Bridge modules)
 13th Signal Battalion
 312th Military Intelligence Battalion, (Combat Electronic Warfare & Intelligence)
 545th Military Police Company
 68th Chemical Company

2nd Armored Division 
 2nd Armored Division, Fort Hood, TX, OPERATION REFORGER unit. POMCUS depots in (Mönchengladbach, Straelen) and ammunition depot in Kevelaer.

5th Infantry Division (Mechanized)

3rd Armored Cavalry 
 3rd Armored Cavalry, Fort Bliss, TX, OPERATION REFORGER unit. POMCUS depots in (Mönchengladbach) and ammunition depot in Kevelaer
 Headquarters and Headquarters Troop
 1-3rd Armored Cavalry Squadron (43x M1A1 Abrams, 38x M3 Bradley, 12x M113, 6x M106, 4x M577, 8x M109)
 2-3rd Armored Cavalry Squadron (43x M1A1 Abrams, 38x M3 Bradley, 12x M113, 6x M106, 4x M577, 8x M109)
 3-3rd Armored Cavalry Squadron (43x M1A1 Abrams, 38x M3 Bradley, 12x M113, 6x M106, 4x M577, 8x M109)
 4-3rd Air Cavalry Squadron (26x AH-64A, 27x OH-58C, 18x UH-60A, 3x EH-60)
 Combat Support Squadron
 43rd Engineer Company
 66th Military Intelligence Company
 Chemical Company

III Corps Artillery 
 III Corps Artillery Fort Sill, TX
 Headquarters and Headquarters Battery
 75th Field Artillery Brigade, Fort Sill, OK
 1st Battalion, 12th Field Artillery (6x MGM-52 Lance)
 1st Battalion, 17th Field Artillery (24x M109A3)
 5th Battalion, 18th Field Artillery (12x M110A2)
 6th Battalion, 27th Field Artillery (27x M270 MLRS)
 2nd Battalion, 34th Field Artillery (24x M109A3 - inactivated 1 September 1989)
 212th Field Artillery Brigade, Fort Sill, OK, OPERATION REFORGER unit. POMCUS depots in Mönchengladbach and ammunition depot in Kevelaer.
 Headquarters and Headquarters Battery
 2nd Battalion, 17th Field Artillery (24x M109A3)
 2nd Battalion, 18th Field Artillery (24x M110A2)
 3rd Battalion, 18th Field Artillery (24x M109A3)
 1st Battalion, 20th Field Artillery (12x M110A2)
 6th Battalion, 32nd Field Artillery (6x MGM-52 Lance, converting to M270 MLRS)
 214th Field Artillery Brigade, Fort Sill, OK
 2nd Battalion, 2nd Field Artillery (M101)
 3rd Battalion, 9th Field Artillery (Pershing II, converting to M270 MLRS)
 Battery C, 25th Field Artillery, Fort Sill (Target Acquisition)

13th Corps Support Command 
 13th Corps Support Command, Fort Hood, TX
 Headquarters and Headquarters Company
 Special Troops Battalion
 4th Materiel Management Center
 1st Medical Group, Fort Hood, TX
 Headquarters and Headquarters Detachment
 15th Combat Support Hospital, Fort Polk, LA
 21st Evacuation Hospital, Fort Hood, TX
 41st Combat Support Hospital, Fort Sam Houston, TX
 47th Medical Supply and Optical Maintenance Battalion
 507th Medical Company (Ambulance)
 64th Corps Support Group, Fort Hood, TX
 2nd Chemical Battalion (attached)
 49th Transportation Battalion (Movement Control)
 62nd Engineer Battalion (attached)
 169th Maintenance Battalion (includes: Company I, 158th Aviation; Company K, 158th Aviation)
 180th Transportation Battalion
 544th Maintenance Battalion
 553rd Supply and Services Battalion (includes: 664th Ordnance Company)

References

External links
 
 
 
 

Orders of battle
Structures of military commands and formations in 1989
NATO